The list of snowiest places in the United States by state shows average annual snowfall totals for the period from mid-1985 to mid-2015. Only places in the official climate database of the National Weather Service, a service of NOAA, are included in this list. Some ski resorts and unofficial weather stations report higher amounts of snowfall than places on this list. Official weather stations are usually located in populated places and snowfall statistics for isolated and unpopulated areas are often not recorded.

Mount Rainier and Mount Baker in Washington are the snowiest places in the United States which have weather stations, receiving  annually on average. By comparison, the populated place with the highest snowfall in the world is believed to be Sukayu Onsen in the Siberian-facing Japanese Alps. Sukayu Onsen receives  (nearly 58 feet) of snow annually. Nearby mountain slopes may receive even more.

The amount of snow received at weather stations varies substantially from year to year.

References

Snow
Precipitation
Weather extremes of Earth
Snowiest
Geography of the United States
Lists of weather records
Snowiest